Paulo Cezar Goulart Siqueira, better known as PC Siqueira (Guarulhos, April 18, 1986), is a  Brazilian YouTuber, presenter, and comic book colourist. He has more than 2 million subscribers on his YouTube account. He makes a lot of content for the internet, as well as programs on TV, TV via MTV Brazil TV, PlayTV and TBS Brazil.

In 2010, PC was hired by Dynamite Entertainment to colour the Stargate: Daniel Jackson limited series.

PC Siqueira is an atheist and antireligionist.

References

Brazilian YouTubers
Brazilian comics artists
Comics colorists
1986 births
Living people
People from Guarulhos
Brazilian atheists
Shorty Award winners